Bence Tóth (born 27 July 1989 in Szolnok) is a Hungarian football player who currently plays for SV Neulengbach.
He played his first league match in 2008.

Tóth played for Hungary at the 2009 FIFA U-20 World Cup in Egypt.

Club statistics

Updated to games played as of 19 May 2019.

Honours
 FIFA U-20 World Cup:
Third place: 2009

References

1989 births
Living people
Hungarian footballers
Hungarian expatriate footballers
People from Szolnok
Hungary youth international footballers
Association football midfielders
Ferencvárosi TC footballers
Lombard-Pápa TFC footballers
Paksi FC players
Szolnoki MÁV FC footballers
Mezőkövesdi SE footballers
Gyirmót FC Győr players
Nemzeti Bajnokság I players
Nemzeti Bajnokság II players
Sportspeople from Jász-Nagykun-Szolnok County
Hungarian expatriate sportspeople in Austria
Expatriate footballers in Austria